Demons is the third studio album by American post-hardcore band Get Scared, released on October 30, 2015, via Fearless Records. The album marks a departure from previous releases, such as Everyone's Out to Get Me and Built for Blame, Laced With Shame in favor of a style reminiscent of the band's 2009 EP Cheap Tricks and Theatrics with metalcore elements mixed in. Demons was produced with Erik Ron who also worked with the band on Everyone's Out to Get Me and Built for Blame, Laced With Shame and received positive reviews upon release.

Reception
New Noise Magazine gave the album a positive review and said "Get Scared has always been one of those bands that deserved way more credit than they were given". Shania Gassner of Strife Magazine gave a positive review and said "the album is very emotional and helps the band as well as the fans to deal with their problems". The album currently has a 4 and a half star rating from Allmusic users.

Track listing

Personnel
Credits for Demons adapted from album booklet.

Get Scared
 Nicholas Matthews - Lead vocals
 Jonathan "Johnny B" Braddock - Lead guitar, backing vocals
 Bradley "Lloyd" Iverson - Bass, backing vocals
 Dan Juarez - Drums, percussion
 Adam Virostko - Rhythm guitar

Production
Erik Ron - producer
Anthony Reeder - engineer
Bryce Umbel - assistant engineer
Tim Beken - assistant engineer
Taylor Larson - mixing, mastering
Sal Torres - A&R
Jon Cottam - album artwork

References

Get Scared albums
2015 albums
Albums produced by Erik Ron